Anesha & Antea Birchett are American singer-songwriters, best known for their work with producers Rodney "Darkchild" Jerkins and D'Mile. Both sisters have written for Beyoncé, H.E.R., Jennifer Lopez, and Justin Bieber, among others. Antea is currently a faculty member of the Detroit Institute of Music Education (DIME).

Songwriting and production credits

Credits are courtesy of Discogs, Tidal, Apple Music, and AllMusic.

«» (Anesha Birchett only)

‹› (Antea Birchett only)

References 

African-American songwriters
American rhythm and blues singer-songwriters
Living people
Year of birth missing (living people)